The 2023 Campeonato Pernambucano (officially the Pernambucano da Série A1 de 2023) is the 109th edition of the state championship of Pernambuco organized by FPF. The championship began on 7 January and will end on TBD 2022. Náutico are the defending champions.

Originally four teams would be promoted from the 2022 Campeonato Pernambucano Série A2 and the 2023 Campeonato Pernambucano would be contested by 12 teams. On 13 November 2022, Central, Maguary, Petrolina and Porto advanced to the semi-finals of the 2022 Série A2 and were promoted to the 2023 Campeonato Pernambucano. However Petrolina were denounced before the Tribunal de Justiça Desportiva de Pernambuco (TJD-PE) for fielding the ineligible player Raykar in the match Maguary v Petrolina played on 8 November 2022 (Third stage, 1st round). Petrolina were deducted four points and sanctioned with a fine of R$3,000 after they were punished, on 22 November 2022, by the TJD-PE and Belo Jardim were promoted instead of Petrolina. Petrolina appealed the decision to the Superior Tribunal de Justiça Desportiva (STJD) and, on 22 December 2022, the STJD overruled the decisions of the TJD-PE giving back the four points to Petrolina and confirming their promotion to the 2023 Série A1 instead of Belo Jardim. Taking into account the possibility of a new appeal that could delay the beginning of the 2023 Campeonato Pernambucano until February 2023, the FPF organised a meeting, on 28 December 2022, with the qualified teams and decided that 13 teams would compete in the tournament including Belo Jardim.

The champions will qualify for 2024 Copa do Brasil and 2024 Copa do Nordeste. The runners-up and the semifinalist with the best performance in the first stage will also qualify for 2024 Copa do Brasil.

Format changes
The tournament will be contested by 13 teams. The relegation stage will not be played and the bottom four teams of the first stage will be relegated to the 2023 Série A2.

Teams

Thirteen teams will be competing, eight returning from the 2022 and five promoted from the 2022 Pernambucano Série A2: Belo Jardim, Central, Maguary, Petrolina and Porto.

Schedule
The schedule of the competition will be as follows.

First stage
In the first stage, each team will play the other nine teams in a single round-robin tournament. The teams will be ranked according to points (3 points for a win, 1 point for a draw, and 0 points for a loss). If tied on points, the following criteria will be used to determine the ranking: 1. Wins; 2. Goal difference; 3. Goals scored; 4. Fewest red cards; 5. Fewest yellow cards; 6. Draw in the headquarters of the FPF.

Top two teams will advance to the semi-finals of the final stages, while teams from third to sixth places will advance to the quarter-finals. The bottom four teams will be relegated to the 2023 Série A2.

Top two teams not already qualified for 2024 Série A, Série B or Série C will qualify for 2024 Série D.

Group A

Results

Final stages
Starting from the quarter-finals, the teams will play a single-elimination tournament with the following rules:
Quarter-finals and semi-finals will be played on a single-leg basis, with the higher-seeded team hosting the leg.
 If tied, the penalty shoot-out will be used to determine the winners.
Finals will be played on a home-and-away two-legged basis, with the higher-seeded team hosting the second leg.
 If tied on aggregate, the penalty shoot-out will be used to determine the winners.
Extra time will not be played and away goals rule will not be used in final stages.
The semifinalist with the best performance in the first stage will qualify for 2024 Copa do Brasil

Bracket

Quarter-finals

|}

Group B

Group C

Semi-finals

|}

Group D

Winners qualify for the 2024 Copa do Brasil.

Group E

Winners qualify for the 2024 Copa do Brasil.

Finals

|}

Matches

Winners qualify for the 2024 Copa do Nordeste.

References

Campeonato Pernambucano seasons
Pernambucano
2023 in Brazilian football